Pembrokeshire is the fifth-largest county in Wales, but has more scheduled monuments (526) than any other local authority area except Powys. This gives it an extremely high density of monuments, with 33.4 per 100km2. (Only the urban authority areas of Newport and Merthyr Tydfil have a higher density). With three-quarters of its boundary being coastline, Pembrokeshire occupies the western end of the West Wales peninsular, terminating with the tiny cathedral city of St David's. It is a historic county in its own right but between 1975 and 1996 it joined with Carmarthenshire and Cardiganshire to form Dyfed.

Over two-thirds of Pembrokeshire's scheduled monuments (346) date to pre-historic times. Even this is too many entries to conveniently show in one list, so the list is subdivided into three, with all the Roman to modern entries on this list, and subdividing the prehistoric sites along the lines of the former local districts of Preseli Pembrokeshire, (the northern half) and South Pembrokeshire. The two lists of prehistoric sites include hill forts, promontory forts on both coastal headlands and inland locations. They also include a variety of enclosures, hut sites and Raths, a wide range of burial sites and other ritual and religious sites listed as barrows and chambered tombs, stone circles and standing stones.

The county's 182 Roman, medieval and post-medieval sites include only three sites from Roman times, but from the Early Medieval period there are many inscribed stones, stone crosses, and holy wells. Also scheduled are many Medieval castles, mottes and baileys, priories, chapels and churches, houses, town walls and a Bishop's palace, along with a wide variety of post-medieval sites from coalmines, kilns and dovecotes through to 19th and 20th century coastal defenses.

Scheduled monuments have statutory protection. The compilation of the list is undertaken by Cadw Welsh Historic Monuments, which is an executive agency of the National Assembly of Wales. The list of scheduled monuments below is supplied by Cadw with additional material from RCAHMW and Dyfed Archaeological Trust.

Roman to modern scheduled monuments in Pembrokeshire
The list is sorted by period, and then by Community so that sites of similar age and locality are placed near each other. Clicking on one of the heading arrows will sort the list by that information.

See also
List of Cadw properties
List of castles in Wales
List of hill forts in Wales
Historic houses in Wales
List of monastic houses in Wales
List of museums in Wales
List of Roman villas in Wales

Notes
Coflein is the online database of RCAHMW: Royal Commission on the Ancient and Historical Monuments of Wales, DAT is the Dyfed Archaeological Trust, Cadw is the Welsh Historic Monuments Agency

References
Coflein is the website database of RCAHMW, DAT is the Dyfed Archaeological Trust, Cadw is the Welsh Historic Monuments Agency

Pembrokeshire
Monuments Roman to modern
Monuments and memorials in Pembrokeshire